The Embassy of Palestine in Beirut was the diplomatic mission of the Palestine in Lebanon. It was located at Adnan al-Hakim Street in Beirut.

Ambassadors

See also

List of diplomatic missions in Lebanon.
List of diplomatic missions of Palestine.

References

Diplomatic missions of the State of Palestine
Diplomatic missions in Lebanon
Lebanon–State of Palestine relations